A177 may refer to:
 A177 road (England), a road connecting Stockton and Durham
 A177 road (Malaysia), a road in Perak connecting Kampung Acheh and Sitiawan